Marco Cingolani (born 1961) is an Italian painter.

Biography
Cingolani was born in Como, Italy, in 1961. He attended artistic high school. In 1978, he moved to Milan and frequented the underground creative environment, where art mixed with fashion and punk music, in collaboration with several artists from the Milanese scene, such as Alessandro Pessoli, Massimo Kaufmann, and Stefano Arienti. This period marks a change in his artistic style.

In 1984, he graduated from the Brera Academy of Fine Arts. In addition to references to the history of art, literature and sacred writings in his paintings, Cingolani began to include criticisms on contemporary reality, and how it is represented by the media. The most famous are the series related to social and chronic themes, such as the series of Le Interviste (the Interviews), L’Attentato al Papa (the Pope's Assassination attempt) and  L'Assassinio di Aldo Moro  (the assassination of Aldo Moro).

Cingolani lives and works in Milan, where he teaches painting at the Brera Academy. He has held exhibitions in several institutions such as the Pecci Museum in Prato, Palazzo Strozzi in Florence, S.M.A.K. in Ghent and the CAP in Milan and the GAMeC in Bergamo. In 2009, he exhibited at the 53rd Venice Biennale. In 2011, for its 50th anniversary, the city of Como dedicated an exhibition in three institutional sites (Broletto, Pinacoteca Civica, Biblioteca Comunale).

References 

20th-century Italian painters
21st-century Italian painters
Painters from Lombardy
Brera Academy alumni
People from Como
1961 births
Living people